Juan Daza (died 1510) was a Roman Catholic prelate who served as Bishop of Córdoba (1504–1510),
Bishop of Cartagena (1502–1504), 
Bishop of Oviedo (1498–1502), 
and Bishop of Catania (1496–1498).

Biography
On 27 June 1496, Juan Daza was appointed during the papacy of Pope Alexander VI as Bishop of Catania.
On 14 February 1498, he was appointed during the papacy of Pope Alexander VI as Bishop of Oviedo. 
On 16 March 1502, he was appointed during the papacy of Pope Alexander VI as Bishop of Cartagena. 
On 4 November 1504, he was appointed during the papacy of Pope Julius II as Bishop of Córdoba. 
He served as Bishop of Córdoba until his death on 21 May 1510.

References

External links and additional sources
 (for Chronology of Bishops) 
 (for Chronology of Bishops) 
 (for Chronology of Bishops)
 (for Chronology of Bishops)
 (for Chronology of Bishops) 
 (for Chronology of Bishops) 
 (for Chronology of Bishops) 
 (for Chronology of Bishops) 

15th-century Roman Catholic bishops in Sicily
16th-century Roman Catholic bishops in Spain
Bishops appointed by Pope Alexander VI
Bishops appointed by Pope Julius II
1510 deaths